Harry Phillips may refer to:

 Harry Phillips (rugby union) (1903–1978), Welsh international rugby union player
 Harry Phillips (judge) (1909–1985), United States federal judge
 Harry Phillips (athlete) (1885–?), South African long-distance runner
 Harry Phillips (Australian footballer) (1867/68–1923), Port Adelaide footballer
 Harry Phillips (footballer, born 1882) (1882–?), English football forward
 Harry Phillips (footballer, born 1997), English football midfielder
 Harry C. J. Phillips (born 1943), political and civic education advocate and political commentator in Western Australia

See also 
 Henry Phillips (disambiguation)